College Love is a 1929 American comedy film directed by Nat Ross and written by John B. Clymer, Pierre Couderc, Leonard Fields and Albert DeMond. The film stars George J. Lewis, Eddie Phillips, Dorothy Gulliver, Churchill Ross, Hayden Stevenson and Sumner Getchell. The film was released on July 7, 1929, by Universal Pictures.

Cast        
George J. Lewis as Robert Wilson
Eddie Phillips as Flash Thomas
Dorothy Gulliver as Dorothy Mae
Churchill Ross as Jimmy Reed
Hayden Stevenson as Coach Jones
Sumner Getchell as Fat

References

External links
 

1929 films
1920s English-language films
American comedy films
1929 comedy films
Universal Pictures films
Films directed by Nat Ross
American black-and-white films
1920s American films